The Volksgesetzbuch was the attempt of Third Reich jurists in the Academy for German Law to replace the Bürgerliche Gesetzbuch by a civil law code aligned with the principles of National Socialism.

The project was terminated in 1944 by Reich Minister of Justice, and head of the Akademie, Otto Georg Thierack.

References 
 

Law in Nazi Germany